WDVR (89.7 FM) is a community radio station serving parts of western New Jersey and eastern Pennsylvania in the United States. The station, which broadcasts a variety format, is licensed to Delaware Township, Hunterdon County, New Jersey.

WDVR is owned by Penn-Jersey Educational Radio Corp. The station is staffed by over fifty volunteers who have expertise in their genre of music or talk.  Hosts are free to choose music and create their shows themselves within the boundaries of "family friendly" programming.  WDVR is supported by donations from its audience.

The station's official mailing address is Sergeantsville, New Jersey.  The station's website claims, "WDVR is the only station in the entire North East which airs a two-hour, live Traditional Country Music show twice a month before a live audience."  The shows are broadcast from the Virginia Napurano Center which is in an old church in Sergeantsville.  The station was founded by Frank and Virginia (Ginny Lee) Napurano and went on the air on February 19, 1990.

In addition it broadcasts 90.5 as WPNJ in Easton, Pennsylvania and 96.9 via translator in Trenton, New Jersey.

See also
List of community radio stations in the United States

References

External links
WDVR official website

Hunterdon County, New Jersey
DVR
Community radio stations in the United States